The 57th United States Congress was a meeting of the legislative branch of the United States federal government, composed of the United States Senate and the United States House of Representatives. It met in Washington, DC from March 4, 1901, to March 4, 1903, during the final six months of William McKinley's presidency, and the first year and a half of the first administration of his successor, Theodore Roosevelt. The apportionment of seats in the House of Representatives was based on the 1890 United States census. Both chambers had a Republican majority.

Major events

 September 6, 1901: Leon Czolgosz shot President William McKinley at the Pan-American Exposition in Buffalo, New York
 September 14, 1901: President William McKinley died. Vice President Theodore Roosevelt became President of the United States
 October 16, 1901: President Roosevelt invited African American leader Booker T. Washington to the White House. The American South reacted angrily to the visit, and racial violence increased in the region.
 December 3, 1901: President Roosevelt delivered a 20,000-word speech to the House of Representatives, asking Congress to curb the power of trusts "within reasonable limits."
 February 22, 1902: Senators Benjamin Tillman and John L. McLaurin, both of South Carolina, have a fist fight while Congress is in session. Both Tillman and McLaurin were later censured by the Senate on February 28.
 June 2, 1902: The Anthracite Coal Strike by the United Mine Workers began, continuing until October 21, 1902.
 July 4, 1902: The Philippine–American War ended.

Major legislation

 June 17, 1902: Newlands Reclamation Act
 June 28, 1902: Isthmian Canal Act (Panama Canal), Sess. 1, ch. 1302, 
 January 21, 1903: Militia Act of 1903 (Dick Act), 
 February 11, 1903: Expediting Act, Sess. 2, ch. 544, 
 February 19, 1903: Elkins Act
 March 3, 1903: Immigration Act of 1903, including §39, the Anarchist Exclusion Act

Party summary

Senate 

 Note: Fred T. Dubois (Idaho) was elected as a Silver Republican, but changed parties to Democratic after this Congress began.

House of Representatives

Leadership

Senate leadership

Presiding
 President: Theodore Roosevelt (R), until September 14, 1901; vacant thereafter.
President pro tempore: William P. Frye (R)
Democratic Caucus Chairman: James K. Jones 
Republican Conference Chairman: William B. Allison

House leadership

Presiding
Speaker: David B. Henderson (R)
Democratic Caucus Chairman: James Hay 
Republican Conference Chairman: Joseph G. Cannon 
Republican Campaign Committee Chairman: Joseph W. Babcock

Majority (Republican) leadership
Majority Leader: Sereno E. Payne
Majority Whip: James A. Tawney

Minority (Democratic) leadership
Minority Leader: James D. Richardson
Minority Whip: James T. Lloyd

Members
This list is arranged by chamber, then by state. Senators are listed by class, and representatives are listed by district.
Skip to House of Representatives, below

Senate
At this time, Senators were elected by the state legislatures every two years, with one-third beginning new six-year terms with each Congress. The Senate class numbers, which indicate the cycle of their election, precede the names in the list below. In this Congress, Class 1 meant their term began in the last Congress, requiring reelection in 1904; Class 2 meant their term began with this Congress, requiring reelection in 1906; and Class 3 meant their term ended with this Congress, requiring reelection in 1902.

Alabama 
 2. John T. Morgan (D)
 3. Edmund W. Pettus (D)

Arkansas 
 2. James H. Berry (D)
 3. James K. Jones (D)

California 
 1. Thomas R. Bard (R)
 3. George C. Perkins (R)

Colorado 
 2. Thomas M. Patterson (D)
 3. Henry M. Teller (SR)

Connecticut 
 1. Joseph R. Hawley (R)
 3. Orville H. Platt (R)

Delaware 
 1. L. Heisler Ball (R), from March 2, 1903
 2. J. Frank Allee (R), from March 2, 1903

Florida 
 1. James P. Taliaferro (D)
 3. Stephen Mallory (D)

Georgia 
 2. Augustus O. Bacon (D)
 3. Alexander S. Clay (D)

Idaho 
 2. Fred T. Dubois (D)
 3. Henry Heitfeld (P)

Illinois 
 2. Shelby M. Cullom (R)
 3. William E. Mason (R)

Indiana 
 1. Albert J. Beveridge (R)
 3. Charles W. Fairbanks (R)

Iowa 
 2. Jonathan P. Dolliver (R)
 3. William B. Allison (R)

Kansas 
 2. Joseph R. Burton (R)
 3. William A. Harris (P)

Kentucky 
 2. Joseph C. S. Blackburn (D)
 3. William J. Deboe (R)

Louisiana 
 2. Murphy J. Foster (D)
 3. Samuel D. McEnery (D)

Maine 
 1. Eugene Hale (R)
 2. William P. Frye (R)

Maryland 
 1. Louis E. McComas (R)
 3. George L. Wellington (R)

Massachusetts 
 1. Henry Cabot Lodge (R)
 2. George Frisbie Hoar (R)

Michigan 
 1. Julius C. Burrows (R)
 2. James McMillan (R), until August 10, 1902
 Russell A. Alger (R), from September 27, 1902

Minnesota 
 1. Moses E. Clapp (R)
 2. Knute Nelson (R)

Mississippi 
 1. Hernando D. Money (D)
 2. Anselm J. McLaurin (D)

Missouri 
 1. Francis M. Cockrell (D)
 3. George G. Vest (D)

Montana 
 1. Paris Gibson (D), from March 7, 1901
 2. William A. Clark (D)

Nebraska 
 1. William V. Allen (P), until March 28, 1901
 Charles H. Dietrich (R), from March 28, 1901
 2. Joseph H. Millard (R), from March 28, 1901

Nevada 
 1. William M. Stewart (R)
 3. John P. Jones (R)

New Hampshire 
 2. Henry E. Burnham (R)
 3. Jacob H. Gallinger (R)

New Jersey 
 1. John Kean (R)
 2. William J. Sewell (R), until December 27, 1901
 John F. Dryden (R), from January 29, 1902

New York 
 1. Chauncey M. Depew (R)
 3. Thomas C. Platt (R)

North Carolina 
 2. Furnifold M. Simmons (D)
 3. Jeter C. Pritchard (R)

North Dakota 
 1. Porter J. McCumber (R)
 3. Henry C. Hansbrough (R)

Ohio 
 1. Marcus A. Hanna (R)
 3. Joseph B. Foraker (R)

Oregon 
 2. John H. Mitchell (R)
 3. Joseph Simon (R)

Pennsylvania 
 1. Matthew S. Quay (R)
 3. Boies Penrose (R)

Rhode Island 
 1. Nelson W. Aldrich (R)
 2. George P. Wetmore (R)

South Carolina 
 2. Benjamin R. Tillman (D)
 3. John L. McLaurin (D)

South Dakota 
 2. Robert J. Gamble (R)
 3. James H. Kyle (R), until July 1, 1901
 Alfred B. Kittredge (R), from July 11, 1901

Tennessee 
 1. William B. Bate (D)
 2. Edward W. Carmack (D)

Texas 
 1. Charles A. Culberson (D)
 2. Joseph W. Bailey (D)

Utah 
 1. Thomas Kearns (R)
 3. Joseph L. Rawlins (D)

Vermont 
 1. Redfield Proctor (R)
 3. William P. Dillingham (R)

Virginia 
 1. John W. Daniel (D)
 2. Thomas S. Martin (D)

Washington 
 1. Addison G. Foster (R)
 3. George Turner (SR)

West Virginia 
 1. Nathan B. Scott (R)
 2. Stephen B. Elkins (R)

Wisconsin 
 1. Joseph V. Quarles (R)
 3. John C. Spooner (R)

Wyoming 
 1. Clarence D. Clark (R)
 2. Francis E. Warren (R)

House of Representatives

Alabama 
 . George W. Taylor (D)
 . Ariosto A. Wiley (D)
 . Henry D. Clayton (D)
 . Sydney J. Bowie (D)
 . Charles Winston Thompson (D)
 . John H. Bankhead (D)
 . John L. Burnett (D)
 . William N. Richardson (D)
 . Oscar Underwood (D)

Arkansas 
 . Philip D. McCulloch Jr. (D)
 . John S. Little (D)
 . Thomas C. McRae (D)
 . Charles C. Reid (D)
 . Hugh A. Dinsmore (D)
 . Stephen Brundidge Jr. (D)

California 
 . Frank Coombs (R)
 . Samuel D. Woods (R)
 . Victor H. Metcalf (R)
 . Julius Kahn (R)
 . Eugene F. Loud (R)
 . James McLachlan (R)
 . James C. Needham (R)

Colorado 
 . John F. Shafroth (SR)
 . John C. Bell (P)

Connecticut 
 . E. Stevens Henry (R)
 . Nehemiah D. Sperry (R)
 . Charles A. Russell (R), until October 23, 1902
 Frank B. Brandegee (R), from November 4, 1902
 . Ebenezer J. Hill (R)

Delaware 
 . L. Heisler Ball (R)

Florida 
 . Stephen M. Sparkman (D)
 . Robert W. Davis (D)

Georgia 
 . Rufus E. Lester (D)
 . James M. Griggs (D)
 . Elijah B. Lewis (D)
 . William C. Adamson (D)
 . Leonidas F. Livingston (D)
 . Charles L. Bartlett (D)
 . John W. Maddox (D)
 . William M. Howard (D)
 . Farish C. Tate (D)
 . William H. Fleming (D)
 . William G. Brantley (D)

Idaho 
 . Thomas L. Glenn (P)

Illinois 
 . James R. Mann (R)
 . John J. Feely (D)
 . George P. Foster (D)
 . James McAndrews (D)
 . William Frank Mahoney (D)
 . Henry S. Boutell (R)
 . George E. Foss (R)
 . Albert J. Hopkins (R)
 . Robert R. Hitt (R)
 . George W. Prince (R)
 . Walter Reeves (R)
 . Joseph G. Cannon (R)
 . Vespasian Warner (R)
 . Joseph V. Graff (R)
 . J. Ross Mickey (D)
 . Thomas J. Selby (D)
 . Ben F. Caldwell (D)
 . Thomas M. Jett (D)
 . Joseph B. Crowley (D)
 . James R. Williams (D)
 . Fred J. Kern (D)
 . George Washington Smith (R)

Indiana 
 . James A. Hemenway (R)
 . Robert W. Miers (D)
 . William T. Zenor (D)
 . Francis M. Griffith (D)
 . Elias S. Holliday (R)
 . James E. Watson (R)
 . Jesse Overstreet (R)
 . George W. Cromer (R)
 . Charles B. Landis (R)
 . Edgar D. Crumpacker (R)
 . George W. Steele (R)
 . James M. Robinson (D)
 . Abraham L. Brick (R)

Iowa 
 . Thomas Hedge (R)
 . John N. W. Rumple (R), until January 31, 1903
 . David B. Henderson (R)
 . Gilbert N. Haugen (R)
 . Robert G. Cousins (R)
 . John F. Lacey (R)
 . John A. T. Hull (R)
 . William P. Hepburn (R)
 . Walter I. Smith (R)
 . James P. Conner (R)
 . Lot Thomas (R)

Kansas 
 . Charles Curtis (R)
 . Justin De Witt Bowersock (R)
 . Alfred Metcalf Jackson (D)
 . James Monroe Miller (R)
 . William A. Calderhead (R)
 . William A. Reeder (R)
 . Chester I. Long (R), until March 4, 1903
 . Charles Frederick Scott (R)

Kentucky 
 . Charles K. Wheeler (D)
 . Henry Dixon Allen (D)
 . John S. Rhea (D), until March 25, 1902
 J. McKenzie Moss (R), from March 25, 1902
 . David Highbaugh Smith (D)
 . Harvey Samuel Irwin (R)
 . Daniel Linn Gooch (D)
 . South Trimble (D)
 . George G. Gilbert (D)
 . James Nicholas Kehoe (D)
 . James Bramford White (D)
 . Vincent Boreing (R)

Louisiana 
 . Adolph Meyer (D)
 . Robert C. Davey (D)
 . Robert F. Broussard (D)
 . Phanor Breazeale (D)
 . Joseph E. Ransdell (D)
 . Samuel M. Robertson (D)

Maine 
 . Amos L. Allen (R)
 . Charles E. Littlefield (R)
 . Edwin C. Burleigh (R)
 . Llewellyn Powers (R), from April 8, 1901

Maryland 
 . William Humphreys Jackson (R)
 . Albert Blakeney (R)
 . Frank C. Wachter (R)
 . Charles R. Schirm (R)
 . Sydney E. Mudd (R)
 . George A. Pearre (R)

Massachusetts 
 . George P. Lawrence (R)
 . Frederick H. Gillett (R)
 . John R. Thayer (D)
 . Charles Q. Tirrell (R)
 . William S. Knox (R)
 . William H. Moody (R), until May 1, 1902
 Augustus P. Gardner (R), from November 4, 1902
 . Ernest W. Roberts (R)
 . Samuel W. McCall (R)
 . Joseph A. Conry (D)
 . Henry F. Naphen (D)
 . Samuel L. Powers (R)
 . William C. Lovering (R)
 . William S. Greene (R)

Michigan 
 . John B. Corliss (R)
 . Henry C. Smith (R)
 . Washington Gardner (R)
 . Edward L. Hamilton (R)
 . William Alden Smith (R)
 . Samuel W. Smith (R)
 . Edgar Weeks (R)
 . Joseph W. Fordney (R)
 . Roswell P. Bishop (R)
 . Rousseau O. Crump (R), until May 1, 1901
 Henry H. Aplin (R), from October 15, 1901
 . Archibald B. Darragh (R)
 . Carlos D. Shelden (R)

Minnesota 
 . James Albertus Tawney (R)
 . James T. McCleary (R)
 . Joel Heatwole (R)
 . Frederick C. Stevens (R)
 . Loren Fletcher (R)
 . R. Page W. Morris (R)
 . Frank Eddy (R)

Mississippi 
 . Ezekiel S. Candler Jr. (D)
 . Thomas Spight (D)
 . Patrick Stevens Henry (D)
 . Andrew F. Fox (D)
 . John Sharp Williams (D)
 . Frank A. McLain (D)
 . Charles E. Hooker (D)

Missouri 
 . James T. Lloyd (D)
 . William W. Rucker (D)
 . John Dougherty (D)
 . Charles F. Cochran (D)
 . William S. Cowherd (D)
 . David A. De Armond (D)
 . James Cooney (D)
 . Dorsey W. Shackleford (D)
 . James Beauchamp Clark (D)
 . Richard Bartholdt (R)
 . Charles F. Joy (R)
 . James Joseph Butler (D), until June 28, 1902, then November 4, 1902 – February 26, 1903
 George Wagoner (R), from February 26, 1903
 . Edward Robb (D)
 . Willard D. Vandiver (D)
 . Maecenas E. Benton (D)

Montana 
 . Caldwell Edwards (P)

Nebraska 
 . Elmer J. Burkett (R)
 . David H. Mercer (R)
 . John S. Robinson (D)
 . William L. Stark (P)
 . Ashton C. Shallenberger (D)
 . William Neville (P)

Nevada 
 . Francis G. Newlands (D)

New Hampshire 
 . Cyrus A. Sulloway (R)
 . Frank Dunklee Currier (R)

New Jersey 
 . Henry C. Loudenslager (R)
 . John J. Gardner (R)
 . Benjamin F. Howell (R)
 . Joshua S. Salmon (D), until May 6, 1902
 De Witt C. Flanagan (D), from June 18, 1902
 . James F. Stewart (R)
 . Richard Wayne Parker (R)
 . Allan L. McDermott (D)
 . Charles N. Fowler (R)

New York 
 . Frederic Storm (R)
 . John J. Fitzgerald (D)
 . Henry Bristow (R)
 . Harry A. Hanbury (R)
 . Frank E. Wilson (D)
 . George H. Lindsay (D)
 . Nicholas Muller (D), until November 22, 1901
 Montague Lessler (R), from January 7, 1902
 . Thomas J. Creamer (D)
 . Henry M. Goldfogle (D)
 . Amos J. Cummings (D), until May 2, 1902
 Edward Swann (D), from November 4, 1902
 . William Sulzer (D)
 . George B. McClellan Jr. (D)
 . Oliver Belmont (D)
 . William H. Douglas (R)
 . Jacob Ruppert (D)
 . Cornelius A. Pugsley (D)
 . Arthur S. Tompkins (R)
 . John H. Ketcham (R)
 . William H. Draper (R)
 . George N. Southwick (R)
 . John Knox Stewart (R)
 . Lucius N. Littauer (R)
 . Louis W. Emerson (R)
 . Charles L. Knapp (R), from November 5, 1901
 . James S. Sherman (R)
 . George W. Ray (R), until September 11, 1902
 John W. Dwight (R), from November 4, 1902
 . Michael E. Driscoll (R)
 . Sereno E. Payne (R)
 . Charles W. Gillet (R)
 . James W. Wadsworth (R)
 . James B. Perkins (R)
 . William H. Ryan (D)
 . De Alva S. Alexander (R)
 . Edward B. Vreeland (R)

North Carolina 
 . John Humphrey Small (D)
 . Claude Kitchin (D)
 . Charles R. Thomas (D)
 . Edward W. Pou (D)
 . William W. Kitchin (D)
 . John D. Bellamy (D)
 . Theodore F. Kluttz (D)
 . E. Spencer Blackburn (R)
 . James M. Moody (R), until February 5, 1903

North Dakota 
 . Thomas Frank Marshall (R)

Ohio 
 . William B. Shattuc (R)
 . Jacob H. Bromwell (R)
 . Robert M. Nevin (R)
 . Robert B. Gordon (D)
 . John S. Snook (D)
 . Charles Q. Hildebrant (R)
 . Thomas B. Kyle (R)
 . William R. Warnock (R)
 . James H. Southard (R)
 . Stephen Morgan (R)
 . Charles H. Grosvenor (R)
 . Emmett Tompkins (R)
 . James A. Norton (D)
 . William W. Skiles (R)
 . Henry C. Van Voorhis (R)
 . John J. Gill (R)
 . John W. Cassingham (D)
 . Robert W. Tayler (R)
 . Charles W. F. Dick (R)
 . Jacob A. Beidler (R)
 . Theodore E. Burton (R)

Oregon 
 . Thomas H. Tongue (R), until January 11, 1903
 . Malcolm A. Moody (R)

Pennsylvania 
 . Henry H. Bingham (R)
 . Robert Adams Jr. (R)
 . Henry Burk (R)
 . James R. Young (R)
 . Edward D. Morrell (R)
 . Thomas S. Butler (R)
 . Irving P. Wanger (R)
 . Howard Mutchler (D)
 . Henry D. Green (D)
 . Marriott Brosius (R), until March 16, 1901
 Henry B. Cassel (R), from November 5, 1901
 . William Connell (R)
 . Henry W. Palmer (R)
 . George R. Patterson (R)
 . Marlin E. Olmsted (R)
 . Charles F. Wright (R)
 . Elias Deemer (R)
 . Rufus K. Polk (D), until March 5, 1902
 Alexander Billmeyer (D), from November 4, 1902
 . Thaddeus M. Mahon (R)
 . Robert Jacob Lewis (R)
 . Alvin Evans (R)
 . Summers M. Jack (R)
 . John Dalzell (R)
 . William H. Graham (R)
 . Ernest F. Acheson (R)
 . Joseph B. Showalter (R)
 . Arthur L. Bates (R)
 . Joseph C. Sibley (R)
 . James K. P. Hall (D), until November 29, 1902
 . Galusha A. Grow (R)
 . Robert H. Foerderer (R)

Rhode Island 
 . Melville Bull (R)
 . Adin B. Capron (R)

South Carolina 
 . William Elliott (D)
 . William J. Talbert (D)
 . Asbury C. Latimer (D)
 . Joseph T. Johnson (D)
 . David E. Finley (D)
 . Robert B. Scarborough (D)
 . J. William Stokes (D), until July 6, 1901
 Asbury F. Lever (D), from November 5, 1901

South Dakota 
 . Charles H. Burke (R)
 . Eben W. Martin (R)

Tennessee 
 . Walter P. Brownlow (R)
 . Henry R. Gibson (R)
 . John A. Moon (D)
 . Charles E. Snodgrass (D)
 . James D. Richardson (D)
 . John W. Gaines (D)
 . Lemuel P. Padgett (D)
 . Thetus W. Sims (D)
 . Rice A. Pierce (D)
 . Malcolm R. Patterson (D)

Texas 
 . Thomas H. Ball (D)
 . Samuel B. Cooper (D)
 . Reese C. De Graffenreid (D), until August 29, 1902
 Gordon J. Russell (D), from November 4, 1902
 . John L. Sheppard (D), until October 11, 1902
 Morris Sheppard (D), from November 15, 1902
 . Choice B. Randell (D)
 . Robert E. Burke (D), until June 5, 1901
 Dudley G. Wooten (D), from July 13, 1901
 . Robert L. Henry (D)
 . Samuel W. T. Lanham (D), until January 15, 1903
 . Albert S. Burleson (D)
 . George Farmer Burgess (D)
 . Rudolph Kleberg (D)
 . James L. Slayden (D)
 . John H. Stephens (D)

Utah 
 . George Sutherland (R)

Vermont 
 . David J. Foster (R)
 . Kittredge Haskins (R)

Virginia 
 . William A. Jones (D)
 . Harry L. Maynard (D)
 . John Lamb (D)
 . Francis R. Lassiter (D)
 . Claude A. Swanson (D)
 . Peter J. Otey (D), until May 4, 1902
 Carter Glass (D), from November 4, 1902
 . James Hay (D)
 . John F. Rixey (D)
 . William F. Rhea (D)
 . Henry D. Flood (D)

Washington 
 . Francis W. Cushman (R)
 . Wesley L. Jones (R)

West Virginia 
 . Blackburn B. Dovener (R)
 . Alston G. Dayton (R)
 . Joseph Holt Gaines (R)
 . James Anthony Hughes (R)

Wisconsin 
 . Henry Allen Cooper (R)
 . Herman B. Dahle (R)
 . Joseph W. Babcock (R)
 . Theobald Otjen (R)
 . Samuel S. Barney (R)
 . James H. Davidson (R)
 . John J. Esch (R)
 . Edward S. Minor (R)
 . Webster E. Brown (R)
 . John J. Jenkins (R)

Wyoming 
 . Frank W. Mondell (R)

Non-voting members 
 . Marcus Aurelius Smith (D)
 . Robert W. Wilcox (I)
 . Bernard Shandon Rodey (R)
 . Dennis T. Flynn (R)
 . Federico Degetau (Resident Commissioner) (R)

Changes in membership
The count below reflects changes from the beginning of the first session of this Congress.

Senate
Note:Delaware's Class 1 Senate seat remained vacant for entire Congress due to the legislature's failure to elect.

 Replacements: 4
 Democratic: 1 seat gain
 Republican: 3 seat gain
 Populist: 1 seat loss
 Deaths: 3
 Resignations: 0
 Vacancy: 1
 Total seats with changes:  6

House of Representatives
 Replacements: 17
 Democratic: 3 seat loss
 Republican: 3 seat gain
 Deaths: 14
 Resignations: 5
 Contested elections: 2
 Total seats with changes: 24

Committees

Senate

 Additional Accommodations for the Library of Congress (Select) (Chairman: James H. Berry; Ranking Member: Shelby M. Cullom)
 Agriculture and Forestry (Chairman: Redfield Proctor; Ranking Member: William B. Bate)
 Appropriations (Chairman: William B. Allison; Ranking Member: Francis M. Cockrell)
 Audit and Control the Contingent Expenses of the Senate (Chairman: John P. Jones; Ranking Member: Hernando D. Money)
 Canadian Relations (Chairman: John F. Dryden)
 Census (Chairman: Joseph V. Quarles; Ranking Member: Samuel D. McEnery)
 Civil Service and Retrenchment (Chairman: George C. Perkins; Ranking Member: William A. Harris)
 Claims (Chairman: Francis E. Warren; Ranking Member: Henry M. Teller)
 Coast and Insular Survey (Chairman: Addison G. Foster; Ranking Member: John Tyler Morgan)
 Coast Defenses (Chairman: John H. Mitchell; Ranking Member: George Turner)
 Commerce (Chairman: William P. Frye; Ranking Member: John P. Jones)
 Corporations Organized in the District of Columbia (Chairman: Thomas S. Martin; Ranking Member: Nelson W. Aldrich)
 Cuban Relations (Chairman: Orville H. Platt; Ranking Member: Henry M. Teller)
 Distributing Public Revenue Among the States (Select)
 District of Columbia (Chairman: James McMillan; Ranking Member: Thomas S. Martin)
 Education and Labor (Chairman: Louis E. McComas; Ranking Member: John W. Daniel)
 Engrossed Bills (Chairman: Francis M. Cockrell; Ranking Member: George F. Hoar)
 Enrolled Bills (Chairman: Mark Hanna; Ranking Member: Murphy J. Foster)
 Establish a University in the United States (Select) (Chairman: William J. Deboe; Ranking Member: James K. Jones)
 Examination and Disposition of Documents (Select) (Chairman: Russell A. Alger)
 Examine the Several Branches in the Civil Service (Chairman: Moses E. Clapp; Ranking Member: Henry Heitfeld)
 Expenditures in Executive Departments
 Finance (Chairman: Nelson W. Aldrich; Ranking Member: George G. Vest)
 Fisheries (Chairman: Thomas R. Bard; Ranking Member: George Turner)
 Five Civilized Tribes of Indians (Select) (Chairman: William B. Bate; Ranking Member: Joseph R. Burton)
 Foreign Relations (Chairman: Shelby M. Cullom; Ranking Member: John T. Morgan)
 Forest Reservations and the Protection of Game (Chairman: Joseph R. Burton; Ranking Member: John T. Morgan)
 Geological Survey (Chairman: John Kean; Ranking Member: Hernando D. Money)
 Immigration (Chairman: Boies Penrose; Ranking Member: Joseph L. Rawlins)
 Indian Affairs (Chairman: William M. Stewart; Ranking Member: John L. McLaurin)
 Indian Depredations (Chairman: Robert J. Gamble; Ranking Member: Augustus O. Bacon)
 Industrial Expositions (Chairman: Henry E. Burnham; Ranking Member: John L. McLaurin)
 Investigate the Condition of the Potomac River Front at Washington (Select) (Chairman: Joseph H. Millard)
 Indian Territory (Select) 
 Interoceanic Canals (Chairman: John Tyler Morgan; Ranking Member: Joseph R. Hawley)
 Interstate Commerce (Chairman: Stephen B. Elkins; Ranking Member: Benjamin R. Tillman)  
 Irrigation and Reclamation of Arid Lands (Chairman: Joseph Simon; Ranking Member: William A. Harris)
 Judiciary (Chairman: George F. Hoar; Ranking Member: Augustus O. Bacon) 
 Library (Chairman: George P. Wetmore; Ranking Member: George G. Vest)
 Manufactures (Chairman: Porter J. McCumber; Ranking Member: John L. McLaurin)
 Military Affairs (Chairman: Joseph R. Hawley; Ranking Member: William B. Bate)
 Mines and Mining (Chairman: Nathan B. Scott; Ranking Member: Benjamin R. Tillman)
 Mississippi River and its Tributaries (Select) (Chairman: Knute Nelson)
 National Banks (Select) (Chairman: Thomas Kearns; Ranking Member: Samuel D. McEnery)
 Naval Affairs (Chairman: Eugene Hale; Ranking Member: Benjamin R. Tillman)
 Organization, Conduct and Expenditures of the Executive Departments (Chairman: Matthew S. Quay; Ranking Member: John L. McLaurin) 
 Pacific Islands and Puerto Rico (Chairman: Joseph B. Foraker; Ranking Member: Francis M. Cockrell)
 Pacific Railroads (Chairman: Jonathan P. Dolliver; Ranking Member: John T. Morgan)
 Patents (Chairman: Jeter C. Pritchard; Ranking Member: Stephen R. Mallory)
 Pensions (Chairman: Jacob H. Gallinger; Ranking Member: George Turner)
 Philippines (Chairman: Henry Cabot Lodge; Ranking Member: Joseph L. Rawlins)
 Post Office and Post Roads (Chairman: William E. Mason; Ranking Member: Alexander S. Clay)
 Potomac River Front (Select) 
 Printing (Chairman: Thomas C. Platt; Ranking Member: James K. Jones)
 Private Land Claims (Chairman: Henry M. Teller; Ranking Member: Eugene Hale)
 Privileges and Elections (Chairman: Julius C. Burrows; Ranking Member: Edmund W. Pettus)
 Public Buildings and Grounds (Chairman: Charles W. Fairbanks; Ranking Member: George G. Vest)
 Public Health and National Quarantine (Chairman: George G. Vest; Ranking Member: John P. Jones)
 Public Lands (Chairman: Henry C. Hansbrough; Ranking Member: James H. Berry)
 Railroads (Chairman: Clarence D. Clark; Ranking Member: Augustus O. Bacon)
 Revision of the Laws (Chairman: Chauncey M. Depew; Ranking Member: John W. Daniel)
 Revolutionary Claims (Chairman: Benjamin R. Tillman; Ranking Member: Joseph Simon)
 Rules (Chairman: John C. Spooner; Ranking Member: Henry M. Teller)
 Standards, Weights and Measures (Select) (Chairman: Alfred B. Kittredge; Ranking Member: Henry M. Teller)
 Tariff Regulation (Select)
 Territories (Chairman: Albert J. Beveridge; Ranking Member: William B. Bate)
 Transportation and Sale of Meat Products (Select) (Chairman: John W. Daniel; Ranking Member: Porter J. McCumber)
 Transportation Routes to the Seaboard (Chairman: William P. Dillingham; Ranking Member: John L. McLaurin)
 Trespassers upon Indian Lands (Select) (Chairman: Charles H. Dietrich; Ranking Member: John T. Morgan)
 Ventilation and Acoustics (Select) (Chairman: L. Heisler Ball)
 Whole
 Woman Suffrage (Select) (Chairman: Augustus O. Bacon; Ranking Member: George P. Wetmore)

House of Representatives

 Accounts (Chairman: Melville Bull; Ranking Member: Charles L. Bartlett)
 Agriculture (Chairman: James W. Wadsworth; Ranking Member: John S. Williams)
 Alcoholic Liquor Traffic (Chairman: Nehemiah D. Sperry; Ranking Member: John L. Burnett)
 Appropriations (Chairman: Joseph G. Cannon; Ranking Member: Leonidas F. Livingston)
 Banking and Currency (Chairman: Charles N. Fowler; Ranking Member: W. Jasper Talbert)  
 Census (Chairman: Albert J. Hopkins; Ranking Member: Francis M. Griffith)
 Claims (Chairman: Joseph V. Graff; Ranking Member: Peter J. Otey)
 Coinage, Weights and Measures (Chairman: James H. Southard; Ranking Member: Charles F. Cochran)
 Disposition of Executive Papers (Chairman: Edward S. Minor; Ranking Member: Charles F. Cochran)
 District of Columbia (Chairman: Joseph W. Babcock; Ranking Member: Adolph Meyer)
 Education (Chairman: Galusha A. Grow; Ranking Member: David A. De Armond)
 Election of the President, Vice President and Representatives in Congress (Chairman: John B. Corliss; Ranking Member: William W. Rucker)
 Elections No.#1 (Chairman: Robert W. Tayler; Ranking Member: Andrew F. Fox)
 Elections No.#2 (Chairman: Marlin E. Olmsted; Ranking Member: James M. Robinson)
 Elections No.#3 (Chairman: Edgar Weeks; Ranking Member: Frank A. McLain)
 Enrolled Bills (Chairman: Frank C. Wachter; Ranking Member: James T. Lloyd)
 Expenditures in the Agriculture Department (Chairman: Charles W. Gillet; Ranking Member: Henry D. Flood)
 Expenditures in the Commerce and Labor Departments (Chairman: David J. Foster; Ranking Member: N/A)
 Expenditures in the Interior Department (Chairman: Charles Curtis; Ranking Member: Henry D. Green)
 Expenditures in the Justice Department (Chairman: Jesse Overstreet; Ranking Member: Henry M. Goldfogle)
 Expenditures in the Navy Department (Chairman: James F. Stewart; Ranking Member: Charles W. Thompson)
 Expenditures in the Post Office Department (Chairman: Irving P. Wanger; Ranking Member: Edward Robb)
 Expenditures in the State Department (Chairman: John H. Ketcham; Ranking Member: Rufus E. Lester)
 Expenditures in the Treasury Department (Chairman: Robert G. Cousins; Ranking Member: John Lamb)
 Expenditures in the War Department (Chairman: Charles A. Russell; Ranking Member: William L. Stark)
 Expenditures on Public Buildings (Chairman: Loren Fletcher; Ranking Member: John H. Small)
 Foreign Affairs (Chairman: Robert R. Hitt; Ranking Member: Hugh A. Dinsmore)
 Immigration and Naturalization (Chairman: William B. Shattuc; Ranking Member: Peter J. Otey)
 Indian Affairs (Chairman: James S. Sherman; Ranking Member: John S. Little)
 Industrial Arts and Expositions (Chairman: James A. Tawney; Ranking Member: Charles L. Bartlett)
 Insular Affairs (Chairman: Henry Allen Cooper; Ranking Member: William A. Jones)
 Interstate and Foreign Commerce (Chairman: William P. Hepburn; Ranking Member: Robert C. Davey)
 Invalid Pensions (Chairman: Cyrus A. Sulloway; Ranking Member: Robert W. Miers)
 Irrigation of Arid Lands (Chairman: Thomas H. Tongue; Ranking Member: Francis G. Newlands)
 Judiciary (Chairman: George W. Ray; Ranking Member: David A. De Armond) 
 Labor (Chairman: John J. Gardner; Ranking Member: W. Jasper Talbert)
 Levees and Improvements of the Mississippi River (Chairman: Richard Bartholdt; Ranking Member: Robert F. Broussard)
 Library (Chairman: James T. McCleary; Ranking Member: Amos J. Cummings then Dudley G. Wooten)
 Manufactures (Chairman: George W. Steele; Ranking Member: Willard D. Vandiver)
 Merchant Marine and Fisheries (Chairman: Charles H. Grosvenor; Ranking Member: Thomas Spight)
 Mileage (Chairman: William A. Reeder; Ranking Member: Elijah B. Lewis)
 Military Affairs (Chairman: John A.T. Hull; Ranking Member: William Sulzer)
 Militia (Chairman: Charles Dick; Ranking Member: William L. Stark)
 Mines and Mining (Chairman: Frank M. Eddy; Ranking Member: Farish Carter Tate)
 Naval Affairs (Chairman: George E. Foss; Ranking Member: Amos J. Cummings)
 Pacific Railroads (Chairman: William A. Smith; Ranking Member: James L. Slayden)
 Patents (Chairman: Walter Reeves; Ranking Member: William Sulzer)
 Pensions (Chairman: Henry C. Loudenslager; Ranking Member: Reese C. De Graffenreid)
 Post Office and Post Roads (Chairman: Eugene F. Loud; Ranking Member: Claude A. Swanson)
 Printing (Chairman: Joel P. Heatwole; Ranking Member: Farish Carter Tate)
 Private Land Claims (Chairman: George W. Smith; Ranking Member: William A. Jones)
 Public Buildings and Grounds (Chairman: David H. Mercer; Ranking Member: John H. Bankhead)
 Public Lands (Chairman: John F. Lacey; Ranking Member: John F. Shafroth)
 Railways and Canals (Chairman: James H. Davidson; Ranking Member: Reese C. De Graffenreid)
 Reform in the Civil Service (Chairman: Frederick H. Gillett; Ranking Member: William Elliott)
 Revision of Laws (Chairman: Vespasian Warner; Ranking Member: John S. Robinson)
 Rivers and Harbors (Chairman: Theodore E. Burton; Ranking Member: Rufus E. Lester)
 Rules (Chairman: John Dalzell; Ranking Member: James D. Richardson) 
 Standards of Official Conduct
 Territories (Chairman: William S. Knox; Ranking Member: John A. Moon)
 Ventilation and Acoustics (Chairman: Roswell P. Bishop; Ranking Member: David H. Smith)
 War Claims (Chairman: Thaddeus M. Mahon; Ranking Member: Thetus W. Sims)
 Ways and Means (Chairman: Sereno E. Payne; Ranking Member: James D. Richardson)
 Whole

Joint committees

 Conditions of Indian Tribes (Special)
 Disposition of (Useless) Executive Papers
 The Library
 Printing

Caucuses
 Democratic (House)
 Democratic (Senate)

Employees

Legislative branch agency directors
Architect of the Capitol: Edward Clark, died January 6, 1902.
Elliott Woods, appointed February 19, 1902.
 Librarian of Congress: Herbert Putnam 
 Public Printer of the United States: Francis W. Palmer

Senate
Secretary: Charles G. Bennett
Sergeant at Arms: Daniel M. Ransdell
Librarian: Cliff Warden
Chaplain: William H. Millburn, Methodist, until December 2, 1902.
F.J. Prettyman, Methodist, elected December 2, 1902.

House of Representatives
Clerk: Alexander McDowell
Sergeant at Arms: Henry Casson
Doorkeeper: William J. Glenn, until March 12, 1902
 Frank B. Lyon, elected March 18, 1902
Postmaster: Joseph C. McElroy
Reading Clerks: E.L. Sampson (D) and Dennis E. Alward (R)
Clerk at the Speaker's Table: Asher C. Hinds
Chaplain: Henry N. Couden, Universalist

See also 
 1900 United States elections (elections leading to this Congress)
 1900 United States presidential election
 1900–01 United States Senate elections
 1900 United States House of Representatives elections
 1902 United States elections (elections during this Congress, leading to the next Congress)
 1902–03 United States Senate elections
 1902 United States House of Representatives elections

Notes

References